Apollo Granforte (20 July 1886, Legnano – 11 June 1975, Milan) was an Italian opera singer and one of the leading baritones during the inter-war period of the 20th century.

Early years and education
At 9 o'clock on the morning of July 22, 1886, when Granforte was two days old, he was left in a basket at the Ospedale Civile in Legnano, wrapped and wearing a bonnet to which a brass medal was attached by white cotton thread. The nuns at the hospice remarked on his large body and strong profile and thus dubbed him Apollinare Granforte, the name which the president Giovanni Tebon wrote down in the hospice's official records. He was adopted by Gaetano Brigo and Rosa Uccelli, a couple from Noventa Vicentina. At nine years old, he was an apprentice cobbler and enjoyed acting and singing at the small theater in town. At 16 he sang tenor in Lucia di Lammermoor, put on by a small company that traveled the countryside and performed in town squares.

On October 5, 1905, Granforte married eighteen-year-old Amabile Frison. They had a daughter, Maria, in the same year and emigrated to Buenos Aires in Argentina to be with Granforte's brother Erminio Brigo. He continued to work as a shoemaker, and on Sundays sang for the Italian immigrants in local taverns. There he was heard by a wealthy music lover named Pedro Valmagia (aka Pietro Balmaggia), who paid for him to study at the La Prensa Conservatory of Buenos Aires. He then transferred to the Instituto Musical Santa Cecilia in the same city, studying with masters Nicholas (Nicola?) Guerrera and Guido Capocci.

Granforte made his stage debut in Rosario, as Germont, in 1913 when he was 27. In that same year he debuted in a concert in La Plata, singing "Eri tu" from Un ballo in maschera and the "Ciel! mio padre" duet from Aida with a soprano student at the Verdi Conservatory in La Plata.

In 1913, at the age of 27, Granforte made his stage debut as Germont at the Rosario Politeama. His success there led to successive engagements at other provincial theatres in Buenos Aires. By 1915 he had also appeared at the Buenos Aires Politeama, the Solis of Montevideo and at Pelotas, Rio Grande and Porto Allegre in Brazil. In one four-week period at Montevideo he sang Silvio in Pagliacci, Marcello in La bohème, Alfio in Cavalleria rusticana, Germont in Traviata, Enrico in Lucia, Rigoletto, Barnaba in La Gioconda, Valentin in Faust, Amonasro in Aida, and Alfonso in La favorita.

While still in Argentina, Granforte and Frison had two more daughters, Ofelia and Leonora. At the outbreak of World War I, Granforte and family returned to Italy sponsored by Valmagia, who had earlier helped the baritone begin his studies. Granforte enlisted at Parma as a grenadier, but became ill and was found unsuitable for the front lines. He then toured the war zone entertaining the Italian troops, alongside Alessandro Bonci and Elvira de Hidalgo.

Career

After the war, while Granforte was singing at the Teatro Costanzi in Rome, his fourth daughter, Costanza, was born. The director of the Opera, Emma Carelli, sent Granforte to Milan for finishing touches in his vocal technique and repertoire. He studied there with the bass Luigi Lucenti and coach Tullio Voghera.

In 1919, Granforte was at Naples and there met composer Pietro Mascagni.  They became lifelong friends and collaborators, the latter always choosing the former as lead baritone when he conducted. In 1921, the impresario Lusardi introduced Granforte to La Scala in Milan. Conductor Arturo Toscanini entrusted the role of Amfortas to him, and in 1921 he made his debut there. In 1924, he went to Australia on a successful tour with Nellie Melba. During Granforte's subsequent tour of Australia in J. C. Williamson's 1932 Grand Opera season, Frank Thring Sr.'s Melbourne-based Efftee Productions filmed him with the Williamson-Imperial Grand Opera Company in a selection from Rossini's The Barber of Seville. This relatively brief footage was released on VHS in 1989 by the National Film and Sound Archive of Australia.

Granforte possessed a big, rich, vibrant voice, quite similar in quality to that of Titta Ruffo,  with a sinister undertone, and quickly established himself in the great baritone roles of Verdi and the verismo composers. He sang some Wagner as well, and also sang Menècrate in the first performance of Mascagni's Nerone in 1935.  His last operatic appearance, after a career of ~ 1,800 performances, was on February 26, 1943 in Pizzetti's Fedra at Trieste's Teatro Verdi.

After retiring from the stage, he taught at the Music Conservatory of Ankara, then at the Prague Opera and in Milan, where he opened a music school at his residence on Via Arici in the Crescenzago section. Among his pupils were soprano Leyla Gencer, bass Raffaele Arié, and tenors Flaviano Labò and Jesús Quiñones Ledesma. He participated in musical life into his 80s, and was often an adjudicator for music competitions. Besides his musical life Granforte was also a successful businessman, inventing a kind of rotating or swiveling lamp in the process. Along with business partner Luigi Devizzi he owned the factory that produced these lamps, as well as a farm, both situated at a large villa in the Milan suburb of Gorgonzola, where he died on June 11, 1975.

Granforte can be heard on HMV early-electrical 78-rpm recordings of Il trovatore, Otello, Pagliacci and Tosca. He also recorded 78-rpm discs of individual arias and duets in the 1920s and 1930s, and the best of these have been reissued on a Preiser CD anthology.  He is considered to have been one of the great Italian baritones of the 1920s and 1930s, alongside Mariano Stabile, Carlo Galeffi, Cesare Formichi, Carlo Tagliabue, Benvenuto Franci and Mario Basiola.

Repertoire
Roles displayed in bold type were created by Granforte in their world premiere.

References

Sources
 Grove Music Online, J.B. Steane, Oxford University Press, 2008.
 Ledesma, Jesús Quiñones. Posts by former Granforte student on his personal and public Facebook pages, 2010–2013.
 Rideout, Bob. "Apollo Granforte", The Record Collector: A Magazine for Collectors of Recorded Vocal Art, volume 41, no. 4, 1996.
 Rideout, Bob. Posts on the Opera-L listserv, April 1999.
 Zanoli, Ivano. "Legnaghesi Famosi - Apollinare Granforte (Apollo in Arte) - Baritono", Il Basso Adige, no. 10, October 2011.

1886 births
1975 deaths
People from Legnano
Argentine baritones
Italian operatic baritones
20th-century Argentine male opera singers
20th-century Italian male opera singers
Italian emigrants to Argentina